The Monsey Church is the colloquial name of a historic Reformed Christian church in the hamlet of Monsey, town of Ramapo, in southern Rockland County, New York, the official name of which, since December 6, 2000, is New Hope Christian Church. The church was founded in 1824 as the True Reformed Dutch Church of West New Hempstead and later became known as the Monsey Christian Reformed Church. The church owns a historic cemetery adjacent to the site of its first meeting house and briefly operated a private Christian school in the 1950s and '60s. Today the church is a member congregation of the Presbyterian Church in America (PCA). It is the only remaining church that was once part of the True Reformed Dutch Church.

History

Origin and early years (1824–1890) 
The Monsey Church was formed out of a split within the Dutch Reformed Church in America. Although earlier events also contributed to the split, the publication of the Rev. Conrad Ten Eyck's book Selections on the Atonement in 1818 was the chief cause. In this book, Ten Eyck advocated a doctrine of unlimited atonement—contrary to the Canons of Dort, one of the doctrinal standards of the Dutch Reformed Church. Asked to defend himself before the Classis of Montgomery meeting at Owasco, New York in 1819, he affirmed that he believed and preached a doctrine of the unlimited atonement of death of Jesus Christ on the cross. Notwithstanding that admission, Classis Montgomery failed to contradict or discipline Ten Eyck, whereupon the matter was appealed to the higher court of the church, the General Synod.

By 1822, two years later, the General Synod had failed to act decisively in the case of Ten Eyck and Classis Montgomery. As a result, the Rev. Dr. Solomon Froeligh of the Dutch Reformed Church of Hackensack-Schraalenburgh, New Jersey (Classis Paramus) became convinced that the toleration of heretical doctrine, a lack of church discipline at all levels, and the widespread profanation of the sacraments put the denomination beyond possibility of reform. In his view, all the marks of a true church had been erased. Accordingly, in meetings that took place on October 22–24, 1822, Froeligh began a movement of secession from the Dutch Reformed Church in America that would result in the establishment of the True Reformed Dutch Church (sometimes called the True Reformed Protestant Dutch Church).

At that time, two Dutch Reformed congregations, one in West New Hempstead, New York (known informally as the Brick Church) and the other in Ramapo, New Jersey were united as a single church with the Rev. James D. Demarest as their pastor since September 21, 1809. Demarest joined the secession movement, and on June 11, 1824, he led 68 members of the two congregations, including two elders, out of the Dutch Reformed Church. The people who seceded from the Brick Church established themselves as a new independent congregation in Monsey and were therefore referred to as the Seceder church. Its first elders were Garret Serven (Sarven), Joseph Iserman, Teunis VanHouten, and Peter C. VanHouten, and its deacons were Peter Serven (Sarven), Stephen VanOrden, and Cornelius Springsteen. One of the members was Jacob Felter, a veteran of the War of 1812 buried in the Historic Monsey Cemetery. On April 26, 1825, the Monsey Church petitioned Classis Hackensack of the newly formed True Reformed Dutch Church to receive them into care, and this was granted. The Monsey Church was established as the True Reformed Dutch Church of West New Hempstead. Worship was held in a building at the corner of Maple Avenue and Saddle River Road, adjacent to the Historic Monsey Cemetery, and a surviving church record book dated September 8, 1827, records to the sale of pews to the officers and members of the church.

James D. Demarest continued as pastor of both the Monsey Church and the Ramapo, New Jersey church for many years. With many more churches than trained pastors, it was commonly the case that pastors would oversee multiple congregations, rotating among them on successive Sundays. One of the deacons at Monsey toward the end of the Rev. James D. Demarest's pastorate was John Yeury de Baun, born in Monsey in 1827. In 1852, when de Baun was 25 years old, he was accepted by Classis Hackensack as a student in theology, under the tutelage of Demarest and the Rev. Abram Van Houten. During the period of –, Van Houten took over the pastorate of Monsey from Demarest, until de Baun had completed his studies in theology in 1855 and called to be the pastor of both the Ramapo, New Jersey and the Monsey churches. De Baun preached alternate Sundays at Ramapo, New Jersey and Monsey until 1860, when he accepted a call to pastor the churches in Hackensack and English Neighborhood, New Jersey.

Shortly after being organized in 1824, land near the present-day Historic Monsey Cemetery was donated to the new church, and work was immediately begun to construct a building. They continued to meet in that location until 1869, after a new building had been constructed on land that had been donated on Main Street. That building, still used by the church today, was dedicated on August 29, 1869.

Merger with and withdrawal from the Christian Reformed Church (1890–1908) 
Although the churches of the True Reformed Dutch Church, including the Monsey Church, were mostly made up of families of Dutch heritage, English was the primary language used in the churches. In 1860, the first movement toward eventual union with the Christian Reformed Church came in the form of correspondence to the True Reformed Dutch Church by a group called the True Reformed Holland Church in the West, in Grand Rapids, Michigan. Ministers from both denominations met a number of times and found themselves to be in agreement in doctrine and practice. Nevertheless, because the Hollanders were by and large a Dutch-speaking group, whereas Classis Hackensack of the True Reformed Dutch Church were primarily English speakers, the decision was made in 1873 not to unite but simply to support and serve each other any way needed.

Beginning in 1880, conditions began to change that would lead to the merger of the True Reformed Dutch Church with the Christian Reformed Church ten years later. In 1880, the True Reformed Dutch Church (Classis Hackensack) learned that the Holland group had changed their name to the Holland Christian Reformed Church, partly to associate themselves more closely with the Christian Reformed Churches of their native Holland. The Holland Christian Reformed Church had also formed their own classis in the east, Classis Hudson, and the denomination had begun to move in the direction of using the English language. Classis Hudson was asked to confer with Classis Hackensack about the possibility of organic union between the two denominations. On April 15, 1890, Classis Hacksensack voted to unite organically with the Holland Christian Reformed Church, requesting that the name of the new denomination be changed simply to the Christian Reformed Church. The Monsey Church was represented at this meeting, however it was then without a pastor, as John R. Cooper had been given up his pastorate of the churches of Monsey and Nanuet due to illness and died not much later in 1886. The True Reformed Dutch Church, the Monsey Church included, was now part of the Christian Reformed Church.

Around the turn of the century, a series of disputes about Freemasonry and membership in other secret societies arose within Classis Hackensack. The first incident was in 1898, when a delegate to the Classis from the Ridgewood, New Jersey church was accused of being a Freemason, contrary to the rules of church government. The man neither affirmed nor denied his membership in Masonry, but he also refused to renounce it. He then withdrew himself as a delegate. His alternate was put forward, but it became clear that he was a member of the Odd Fellows, and the Classis did not seat him. This ultimately resulted in the Ridgewood church's withdrawal from the Christian Reformed Church early in 1899.

A similar case involved the Rev. Charles N. Van Houten, son of the Monsey Church's second pastor, the Rev. Abraham (Abram) Van Houten. The younger Van Houten had been the pastor of a Presbyterian church for some 20 years, but around 1905 was called by the church in Schraalenberg, New Jersey to be its pastor due to the old age and infirmity of the Rev. Garret A. Haring, who had been ministering there. Charles Van Houten was a Freemason, and he agreed that he would withdraw from the organization, in submission to the rules, if he were to join with Classis Hackensack. He accepted the call, was received by the Classis, and did withdraw from Freemasonry. Classis Hudson, however, learned of this decision and was not satisfied. The Stated Clerk sent a letter to Classis Hackensack informing them that they would protest the admission of Charles Van Houten and would not recognize him as a minister of the gospel.

Early in 1908, a resolution was put before Classis Hackensack to withdraw from the Christian Reformed Church since rules about "minor secret organizations" and other matters had caused so much agitation in the churches and in meetings of the Classis, and conflict between Classis Hudson and itself. On June 2, 1908, after referral to the churches, the decision was ratified to withdraw from the Christian Reformed Church. The Monsey Church, through its pastor John Calvin Voorhis, cast a vote to withdraw. The Monsey Church was once again part of the True Reformed Dutch Church, newly re-constituted.

The newly independent Classis Hackensack quickly passed a resolution to deal with the trouble that had arisen in the period –: "Resolved that in the future we eliminate the inquiry respecting all secret societies according to Art. 32 of our confession." John Calvin Voorhis, who had just been released from his pastorate at Monsey and been named counselor instead, opposed this resolution and had his name recorded in the minutes as opposed to it.

Season of decline (1909–1925) 
In Classis Hackensack, there were now far fewer pastors than there were churches needing their ministry. After John Calvin Voorhis was released from his pastorate in Monsey, the Monsey Church found that it could not expect regular pulpit supply. The church continued to meet during the summer months, relying on seminary students to fill the pulpit, but began to close during the winter. Peter Steen was one such student, who spent the summer of 1920 ministering in Monsey.

A number of churches in the Classis either closed or withdrew, and those that remained were weak and struggling. By 1921, the Monsey Church had only six active members, in spite of the fact that a Sunday school had been started in 1920. The members voted at a congregational meeting held on May 3, 1921 to deed the church property to Classis Hackensack, and that was accomplished in a quit-claim deed dated July 20, 1921, executed by Crine Hook, "as sole surviving elder and trustee of the True Reformed Dutch Church of West New Hempstead." Classis Hackensack of the True Reformed Dutch Church now consisted of only three churches (the Monsey Church; Leonia, New Jersey; and New york City) and two ministers (John Calvin Voorhis and Samuel Vanderbeek). Then, on Monday morning, October 23, 1922, John Calvin Voorhis died. The day before he had preached at the Monsey Church a sermon on John 10:28–29. Only the Rev. Samuel Vanderbeek, who was old and ill, remained to care for these three churches. He himself died on August 11, 1924.

Renewal in the Christian Reformed Church (1925–2005) 
What few people remained in the churches of Classis Hackensack in 1924 voted to dissolve and re-affiliate with the Christian Reformed Church. That occurred on February 19, 1925 and opened the door to new opportunities for ministry in and around Monsey. In 1925 John Beebe, a ministerial candidate, accepted the call to become Home Missionary in the East, working in Monsey. Sunday services were held at the Monsey Church nearly every week. A group for the women in the church, called The Martha Circle, was organized on March 12, 1926, with Mrs. Beebe as president. The women in the Circle worked to raise money for various charitable causes. For example, on December 4, 1926, a "food and fancy article sale" was held that raised $140.50 to help paint the church. At the May 18, 1927 meeting, the members voted to give $25 to help relieve suffering from the Great Mississippi Flood of 1927, one of the greatest natural disasters the country had yet experienced.

The Rev. Meindert Botbyl succeeded Beebe in 1928 and resided in Monsey until his death in 1940. After Botbyl's pastorate, little attention was given to Monsey. Harold Dekker, who would later be called to pastor the Christian Reformed Church of Englewood, ministered in Monsey during the summer of 1940 while still a seminary student. A single weekly preaching service was supplied, but no full-time effort was expended until 1948, when the Eastern Home Missionary Board of the Christian Reformed Church decided to place seminarian Dick L. Van Halsema in Monsey for a trial period of 12 weeks. The summer of 1948 when Van Halsema was in Monsey marked the beginning of the congregation's revival leading up to the present. Van Halsema's efforts were greatly assisted by the Rev. Harold Dekker, now installed as pastor in Englewood. In May, 1949, it was reported that there were 20 communicant and four baptized members of the Monsey Church. By May 6, 1950, there were enough people at the Monsey Church for the "young people of the Christian Reformed Chapel, Monsey, N.Y." to travel to Englewood, New Jersey to serve the 75th anniversary banquet meal.

In 1949, Van Halsema was ordained and installed at Monsey as Home Missionary for the East. A new parsonage was erected by the people in 1950, and on September 26, 1952, the Monsey Christian Reformed Church was re-organized, having grown from one member in 1948 to fourteen families. Van Halsema was installed as pastor of the re-organized church on April 1, 1954, and remained in Monsey until July 23, 1956, when he departed to accept a call to organize a church in Miami, Florida.

The Monsey Church grew rapidly, along with Rockland County itself, in the 1950s. The church was home to a large private Christian school and had a thriving Sunday school program and morning and evening Sunday services. With the opening of the New York State Thruway and the Tappan Zee Bridge in the mid-1950s, Rockland County grew rapidly—and the Monsey Church with it. Beginning in the 1970s, however, the pace of growth of the county began to slow. Along with a rising trend in the cost of living, an increasing number of Orthodox and Hasidic Jews have settled in Monsey and the immediate area. The result of this demographic change is that an extraordinary number of non-Jewish families have moved out of the area. Present-day Monsey, like nearby Kaser and New Square (and Kiryas Joel in Orange County) can be considered a modern-day suburban shtetl.

Monsey Church today (2005–present) 
In 2000, the Monsey Church changed its name from Monsey Christian Reformed Church to New Hope Christian Church. In 2004, the congregation voted to withdraw again from the Christian Reformed Church. In a letter dated March 22, 2005 from the Stated Clerk of Classis Hudson of the Christian Reformed Church, the congregation was informed that the Classis approved a motion to "acquiesce in the decision of the New Hope CRC of Monsey, NY to disaffiliate itself with the Christian Reformed Church in North America." After a few years as an independent congregation, in 2007 the church was received into the Metropolitan New York Presbytery of the Presbyterian Church in America.

The church continues to meet in its 1869 building at 57 Main Street, on New York State Route 306, in Monsey, about 1/4 mile north of Route 59. Christian worship is open to the public and begins at 11 o'clock every Sunday morning.

Pastors and ministers

The Historic Monsey Cemetery 
The Historic Monsey Cemetery (also called Monsey Memorial Cemetery, Seceder Cemetery, or Monsey Rural Cemetery) is located at the corner of Maple Avenue and N. Saddle River Road. The cemetery belongs to the Monsey Church. It sits adjacent to the site of the original True Reformed Dutch Church building that had been donated by Judge Garret Serven, one of the elders of the Brick Church who seceded with the Rev. James D. Demarest to form the True Reformed Dutch Church of Monsey. In 1869, the church moved to their present building on Main Street. The original building that was next to the cemetery was moved to Grove Street and began to be used by the Congregational church.

A database of people buried in the Historic Monsey Cemetery is available from the Genealogical Society of Rockland County. Many early members of the church are buried there, including the founding pastor, James D. Demarest. Veterans of the Revolutionary War, the War of 1812, and the Civil War are all buried in the cemetery (see table below).

Israel Saffer of the Museum of Spring Valley and Countryside worked vigorously in the 1960s to enlist help from the government and community groups to maintain the cemetery. The cemetery is maintained by community groups such as the Monsey Lions Club and the Stony Point Battle chapter of the Sons of the American Revolution. Most recently, Eagle Scout candidate Brian Negrin did significant restoration work on the cemetery as part of his Eagle Scout project in 2011.

Vandals have damaged the cemetery on at least one occasion. A record in the Consistory's minutes from November 19, 1953 states that the police were called because 17 headstones had been pushed over.

Rockland County Christian School 
Rockland County Christian School was founded in the spring of 1953. In effect, it was a Christian education ministry of the Monsey Church, although it was portrayed as being less dependent than that. A school newsletter from that summer says that "The Monsey Church does not sponsor the school. In this sense, it is not parochial. Parents band together and they incorporate to accomplish this purpose." A constitution was adopted and an independent board of directors for the school was elected from the church's membership in May, 1953.

The school first opened in the church basement on September 9, 1953 with a total of 14 pupils in Kindergarten and grades 1 through 7, except grade 3. In fall 1954, the school had grown to 20 pupils and became accredited by the New York State Board of Regents. A total of 36 students were enrolled in the 1959–60 school year, the school's last year of operation.

Geraldine Steensma was the school's first full-time teacher, for five years, and Willemina Van Halsema, the sister of the church's pastor and a community worker at the church, also taught part-time the first two years. Other teachers at the school were Eleanor Sietsema, M. Louise Crawford, Faye Campbell (aide), James Stabile (music), Katherine Hunt, Donald Vittner, and Constance Pryce.

Other Monsey churches 
In spite of its nickname as the Monsey Church, there were other churches in Monsey in the 19th and early 20th centuries. The Monsey Church was, however, the first church in Monsey and is the only one that continues to the present day. The building first used by the Monsey Church was located near the intersection of what is today Maple Avenue and North Saddle River Road in Monsey, adjacent to the Historic Monsey Cemetery. When the Monsey Church moved into its present building in 1869, that original building was sold and moved somewhere near today's Brewer Fire Engine Company at the intersection of Grove Street and North Saddle River Road. In 1871, this building was purchased by the Congregational Society and used as their meeting house.

At about the same time that the Congregationalists were beginning to meet in their new building, the Methodist Society established a new church in Monsey in October, 1871 by members of the Spring Valley and Viola Methodist Churches. By 1876, as seen on the 1876 "Centennial" map of Monsey, the church had built a building to meet in on Secor Street. Sometime later, however, the church building was destroyed in a fire. The property was later acquired by the Monsey Church and is the present-day site of their parsonage.

References 
Notes

References

External links 

 For more on the history of the True Reformed Dutch Church, including details of the controversy surrounding Conrad Ten Eyck, see "A Brief History of the True Reformed Protestant Dutch Church" in four parts, published in The Banner
of Truth, vol. 4, nos. 1–4 (July–October, 1869)
 The Banner of Truth, volume 1, various issues (1866), edited by former Monsey Church pastor John Yeury de Baun was the denominational magazine of the True Reformed Dutch Church.
 The Banner of Truth, volumes 4–6 (1869–1872)
 The Banner of Truth, volumes 5–7 (1871–1873)
 New Hope Christian Church website
 Presbyterian Church in America (PCA)

Churches in Rockland County, New York
19th-century Calvinist and Reformed churches
Presbyterian churches in New York (state)
Monsey, New York
Wooden churches in the United States
Religious organizations established in 1824
1824 establishments in New York (state)
Presbyterian Church in America churches in New York (state)
Ramapos